Cornelis van Steenwijk (30 March 1897 – February 1974) was a Dutch painter. His work was part of the painting event in the art competition at the 1924 Summer Olympics.

References

1897 births
1974 deaths
20th-century Dutch painters
Dutch male painters
Olympic competitors in art competitions
Artists from The Hague
20th-century Dutch male artists